Digah (also, Digyakh) is a village and municipality in the Quba Rayon of Azerbaijan.  It has a population of 1,760.

References 

Populated places in Quba District (Azerbaijan)